The Avalon Project is a digital library of documents relating to law, history and diplomacy.  The project is part of the Yale Law School Lillian Goldman Law Library.

The project contains online electronic copies of documents dating back to the beginning of history, making it possible to study the original text of not only very famous documents such as Magna Carta, the English Bill of Rights, and the United States Bill of Rights, but also the text of less well known but significant documents which mark turning points in the history of law and rights.

The site has full search facilities and a facility to electronically compare the text of two documents. It also hosts Project Diana: An Online Human Rights Archive.

References

External links
 The Avalon Project
  YLS Avalon Project

Digital history projects
Discipline-oriented digital libraries
American digital libraries
Legal documents
Yale Law School
Digital humanities projects